Dumitru Botez (born 2 October 1973) is a Romanian former footballer who played as a left midfielder.

References

1973 births
Living people
Romanian footballers
Association football midfielders
Liga I players
Liga II players
CSM Ceahlăul Piatra Neamț players
FC Vaslui players
Romanian football managers
People from Târgu Neamț